Vargas Municipality is the only municipality of the Vargas state in Venezuela.

References

Municipalities of Vargas (state)